Lizunovo is a rural locality (a village) in Karinskoye Rural Settlement, Alexandrovsky District, Vladimir Oblast, Russia. The population was 304 as of 2010. There are 19 streets.

Geography 
Lizunovo is located 26 km southwest of Alexandrov (the district's administrative centre) by road. Grigorovo is the nearest rural locality.

References 

Rural localities in Alexandrovsky District, Vladimir Oblast
Alexandrovsky Uyezd (Vladimir Governorate)